Sphendale was a deme of ancient Attica at which Persian general Mardonius halted on his route from Deceleia to Tanagra. In the territory of Sphendale there was a hill, named Hyacinthus.

Its site is unlocated.

References

Populated places in ancient Attica
Former populated places in Greece
Lost ancient cities and towns
Demoi